Juho (Jussi) Raatikainen (12 October 1898, Kivijärvi - 13 September 1978) was a Finnish journalist and politician. He served as Deputy Minister of Agriculture from 29 July 1948 to 17 March 1950 and Deputy Minister of the Interior from 30 July 1948 to 17 March 1950. He was a member of the Parliament of Finland  from 1936 to 1951, representing the Social Democratic Party of Finland (SDP).

References

1898 births
1978 deaths
People from Kivijärvi
People from Vaasa Province (Grand Duchy of Finland)
Social Democratic Party of Finland politicians
Ministers of Agriculture of Finland
Ministers of the Interior of Finland
Members of the Parliament of Finland (1936–39)
Members of the Parliament of Finland (1939–45)
Members of the Parliament of Finland (1945–48)
Members of the Parliament of Finland (1948–51)
Finnish people of World War II